Warren Brown may refer to:

Warren Brown (actor) (born 1978), English actor
Warren Brown (cartoonist) (born 1965), Australian cartoonist and TV presenter
Warren Brown (politician) (1836–1919), American politician
Warren Brown (sailor) (1929–2014), Bermudian Olympic sailor
Warren Brown (sportswriter) (1894–1978), American sportswriter
Warren Brown (television host), American television host on the Food Network
Warren C. Brown, American professor of history in California
Warren G. Brown (1921–1987), American rodeo bull rider known as "Freckles Brown"
Warren S. Brown (born 1944), American neuropsychologist, professor and researcher
Warren Brown, American political activist and plaintiff, see Clyde cancer cluster